Malaysia competed in the 2003 Southeast Asian Games held in Hanoi and Ho Chi Minh City, Vietnam from 5 to 13 December 2003.

Medal summary

Medals by sport

Medallists

Aquatics

Diving

Men

Women

Swimming

Men

Football

Men's tournament
Group B

Semifinal

Bronze medal match

Women's tournament
Group A

Semifinal

Bronze medal match

References

2003
Nations at the 2003 Southeast Asian Games